Neelu (1936–2018) is a Tamil actor.

Neelu is an Indian name. It may refer to

 Neelu Vaghela (born 1970), Indian actress
 Neelu Kohli, Indian actress
 Neelu Rohmetra, Indian academic

See also
 Nilu Phule (1930s–2009), Marathi actor